Edwin Cannan (3 February 1861, Funchal, Madeira – 8 April 1935, Bournemouth), the son of David Cannan and artist Jane Cannan, was a British economist and historian of economic thought. He was a professor at the London School of Economics from 1895 to 1926.

As a partisan of Jevonianism, Edwin Cannan is perhaps best known for his logical dissection and destruction of Classical theory in his famous 1894 tract A History of the Theories of Production and Distribution. Although Cannan had personal and professional difficulties with Alfred Marshall, he was still   "Marshall's man" at the LSE from 1895 to 1926. During that time, particularly during his long stretch as chairman after 1907, Edwin Cannan shepherded the LSE away from its roots in Fabian socialism into tentative Marshallianism. This period was only to last, however, until his protégé, Lionel Robbins, took over with his more "Continental" ideas.

Though Cannan, in his early years as an economist, was a critic of classical economics and an ally of interventionists, he moved sharply to the side of classical liberalism in the early 20th century.  He favored a simplicity, clarity, and common sense in the exposition of economics.  According to Geoffrey M. Hodgson, Cannan "emphasised the institutional foundation of economic systems".

Major works
 
 
 The Origin of the Law of Diminishing Returns, 1813-15, 1892, The Economic Journal (EJ).
 Ricardo in Parliament, 1894, EJ.
 
 A History of the Theories of Production and Distribution in English Political Economy from 1776 to 1848, 1898.
 
 The Economic Outlook, 1912.
 Wealth, 1914.
 Early History of the term "Capital", 1921, QJE.
 An Application of the Theoretical Apparatus of Supply and Demand to Units of Currency, 1921, EJ.
 Money: Its connexion with rising and falling prices, 1923.
 Monetary Reform, with J.M. Keynes, Addis and Milner, 1924, EJ
 An Economist's Protest, 1927
 A Review of Economic Theory, 1929
 Modern Currency and the Regulation of Its Value, London: D.S. King and Son, 1932.
 Collected Works of Edwin Cannan (1998, 8 volumes), edited by Alan Ebenstein (London & New York: Routledge/Thoemmes Press)

See also
 William Harold Hutt

Notes

External links

 
 Edwin Cannan at cepa.newschool.edu
 Cannan index at socserv2.socsci.mcmaster.ca
 Catalogue of Edwin Cannan papers at London School of Economics (LSE) Archives
 Edwin Cannan's Library at LSE Archives

1861 births
1935 deaths
British economists
Historians of economic thought
Academics of the London School of Economics